Luychujasa (possibly from in the Quechua spelling Luychu Q'asa; luychu, taruka, deer, q'asa mountain pass, "deer pass") is a mountain in the Andes of Peru which reaches a height of approximately . It is located in the Huancavelica Region, Churcampa Province, Anco District. A small lake named Yanacocha (Quechua for "black lake") lies at its feet.

References

Mountains of Peru
Mountains of Huancavelica Region